Golgi is a tiny lunar impact crater located in the Oceanus Procellarum, over 150 kilometers to the north of the crater Schiaparelli.  It is a circular, cup-shaped impact formation with an interior albedo that is higher than the surrounding dark lunar mare. This crater was previously designated Schiaparelli D before being given a name by the IAU.

References

 
 
 
 
 
 
 
 
 
 
 
 

Impact craters on the Moon